Razakan (also Romanized as Razaḵān) is a village in Razakan Rural District of the Central District of Shahriar County, Tehran province, Iran. At the 2006 National Census, its population was 5,675 in 1,452 households. The following census in 2011 counted 5,661 people in 1,537 households. The latest census in 2016 showed a population of 5,460 people in 1,596 households; it was the largest village in its rural district.

References 

Shahriar County

Populated places in Tehran Province

Populated places in Shahriar County